D424 is a state road in Croatia that connects the city of Zadar with the A1 motorway. It links Gaženica port in southern Zadar and Zadar 2 interchange on A1 motorway, executed as a dual carriage expressway connector, with an  speed limit. The D424 has five interchanges. Together with the new Gaženica port and the Crno commercial zone, the expressway is expected to bring prosperity to Zadar.

The road, as well as all other state roads in Croatia, is managed and maintained by Hrvatske ceste, state-owned company.

Traffic volume
Traffic is regularly counted and reported by Hrvatske ceste, operator of the road. Substantial variations between annual (AADT) and summer (ASDT) traffic volumes are attributed to the fact that the road connects a number of summer resorts to Croatian motorway network.

Road junctions and populated areas

References

External links
 Motorways-exits of D424

Expressways in Croatia
State roads in Croatia
Transport in Zadar County